The Ashby Canal Association (ACA) is a waterway society and a registered charity No. 1063566, in Leicestershire and Staffordshire, England, concerned with the Ashby Canal, and affiliated to the Inland Waterways Association.

The Association was founded in 1966 in response to the closure of the northern eight miles of the Ashby Canal. The Association's work parties are active in the restoration and reconnection to the main waterway, in partnership with the Ashby Canal Trust.

See also
 Ashby Canal Trust
 List of waterway societies in the United Kingdom
 National Forest

References

External links
 
 UK Government, House of Commons Select Committee on Environment, Food, and Rural Affairs: Memorandum submitted by the Ashby Canal Association
 Leicestershire County Council website, listing for Ashby Canal Association
 Warwickshire County Council website, listing for Ashby Canal Association
 British Waterways' leisure website "Waterscape", listing for Ashby Canal Association
 Ashby Canal Association's magazine "Spout", Sept. 2006

Waterways organisations in England